The Aérospatiale Alouette is a family of light helicopters manufactured by SNCASE, Sud Aviation, and Aérospatiale:

 SNCASE Alouette - company designation SE.3120; piston-engined, not directly related to the Alouette II.
 Aérospatiale Alouette II - company designation SA 313/SA 318.
 Aérospatiale Lama - company designation SA 315B; hot and high variant of the Alouette II.
 Aérospatiale Alouette III - company designation SA 316/SA 319.
 Aérospatiale Alouette IV - original designation for the Aérospatiale SA 330A Puma.

Aérospatiale aircraft